Diana Marcela Bolaños Rodríguez is a Colombian marine biologist who has studied and classified various types of platyhelminths. She was a recipient of the L'Oréal-UNESCO Fellowship for Women in Science in 2010, was selected as Colombian biologist of the year in 2012, and in 2013 was named by the BBC as one of the top ten women in science in Latin America.

Biography
Diana Marcela Bolaños Rodríguez was born in 1981 in Bogotá, Colombia, and grew up there. At the age of 19 she enrolled in the Universidad Jorge Tadeo Lozano at the campus in Santa Marta on the Caribbean side of Colombia. After completing her undergraduate work with a thesis on flatworms, in 2003, Bolaños continued her education at the University of New Hampshire (UNH) in the United States. She received her PhD in zoology from UNH in Durham, New Hampshire, in 2008 with an Award for Excellence in Research from the Department of Zoology. Her research focused on polyclad flatworms, a marine worm which is unique in its ability to generate tissue through stem cells.

She married an American, Joseph Dunn, whom she had met while in New Hampshire, and in 2008 returned to Colombia to continue her research, completing a database of flatworm species and their taxonomic groups. Bolaños also took a teaching post as a visiting professor for the University of the Andes (Uniandes). In 2010, she was awarded a L'Oréal-UNESCO Fellowship for Women in Science and she used the award to complete her postdoctoral research at Uniandes. Bolaños then took a post as an assistant professor in the Biology Program at the Universidad de Cartagena. In 2012 she was named Colombian biologist of the year and in 2013 was named one of the top ten women scientists in Latin America by the BBC. Despite the difficulties of finding funding for research, Bolaños has remained in Colombia, in part to inspire others' interests in science and in part to fill the gap because so many post-graduates from Colombia remain part of the diaspora. She has continued her research and is working on comparisons between polyclads, planarians and other types of platyhelminths and their abilities to regenerate. In addition, she has published numerous articles in international, peer-reviewed journals such as Evolution & Development, the Journal of Natural History and Zootaxa in the areas of evolution and biological systematics, as well as continuing her education at courses such as the Society for Developmental Biology short course held in Montevideo, Uruguay. The flatworm Bisacculosuteri marcelae was named in her honor in 2019.

Selected works

References

External links 
WorldCat Publications
Colombian Government Scientist Profile publications list

1981 births
Living people
People from Bogotá
Women marine biologists
L'Oréal-UNESCO Awards for Women in Science fellows
21st-century women scientists
Colombian women biologists
Jorge Tadeo Lozano University alumni
University of New Hampshire alumni
Academic staff of the University of Los Andes (Colombia)
Academic staff of the University of Cartagena